, also known as Yori Nakamura, is a retired Japanese shoot wrestler and an instructor in shoot wrestling, Jeet Kune Do, Filipino Martial Arts, Silat, and Muay Thai.

Life and career

Nakamura had trained in various martial arts, among them kickboxing, wushu and Kansui-ryu karate, until February 1984 when he enrolled at the Tiger Gym of Satoru Sayama. In November 1985, he became a full-time staff member of Sayama's gym. He trained in Sayama's style of shoot wrestling and in June 1986, he competed at the tournament celebrated in the first Shooto event. He won the first fight by decision, the second by rear naked choke, the third by keylock and the last by pillow hold, winning the tournament.

In January 1989, Nakamura went to the United States and became a student of Dan Inosanto in Jeet Kune Do, Filipino martial arts, and silat. In 1992, he founded USA Shooto Association. On returning to Japan the same year, he became the founder and head instructor of Inosanto-Methods Unified Martial Arts Association (IUMA).

Notable students
 Ron Balicki:  MARS Head Instructor, producer, stuntman
 Dan Inosanto:  martial arts instructor
 Junichi Okada: actor and martial arts instructor
 Erik Paulson:  CSW Head Instructor

Lineages

Catch wrestling (+ Shooto) lineage

 Billy Riley/Frank Wolfe  → Karl Gotch → Satoru Sayama → Yorinaga Nakamura

Jeet Kune Do lineage

 Bruce Lee → Dan Inosanto → Yorinaga Nakamura

References

1963 births
Living people
Japanese wrestlers
Japanese Jeet Kune Do practitioners
Japanese eskrimadors
Silat practitioners
Sportspeople from Mie Prefecture